On 23 April 2021, a man stabbed a police employee to death at a police station in Rambouillet, France.

Attack
At around 2:20pm on 23 April 2021 a fatal stabbing occurred in Rambouillet, Yvelines, Île-de-France. An unarmed administrative assistant was twice stabbed from behind in the throat by the assailant. The knifeman was shot twice by police at the scene and died from his wounds.

Attacker
The attacker was named as Jamel Gorchene, a 36-year-old Tunisian man who arrived in France illegally in 2009 who was not known to security services. He lived illegally in France for ten years until he obtained residency papers in 2020 which were valid until December 2021. He had recently moved to Rambouillet.

His Facebook posts were almost exclusively concerned with the defence of the Muslim community and Islamophobia. In October 2020, a few days after a jihadist murdered French schoolteacher Samuel Paty, he changed his profile picture and joined an online campaign named Respectez Mohamed prophète de Dieu (English: respect Mohammed, the prophet of God).

Gorchene watched videos which glorified and encouraged martyrdom and jihad before his attack.

Victim 
The dead woman, Stéphanie Monfermé, was a 49-year-old mother of two. According to police sources referenced by Agence France-Presse, she had worked for the police for 28 years. She worked in administration and was not a police officer, and consequently did not wear a uniform or carry a sidearm.

A ceremony was held in Rambouillet 26 April to commemorate Monfermé which was attended by government ministers, her husband and two daughters, and hundreds of French mourners.

Reaction
Prime Minister Jean Castex and Interior Minister Gérald Darmanin visited the scene of the attack and president Emmanuel Macron visited the family of the victim.

An investigation into the attack was launched by the French  (PNAT). Macron reaffirmed his opposition to Islamic terrorism. National Rally leader Marine Le Pen criticised the decision to grant French residency to an illegal immigrant.

References

April 2021 events in France
2021 murders in France
2020s in Île-de-France
April 2021 crimes in Europe
History of Yvelines
Murder in Île-de-France
Stabbing attacks in 2021
Stabbing attacks in France
Terrorist incidents in Île-de-France
Terrorist incidents involving knife attacks
Terrorist incidents in France in 2021
Islamic terrorist incidents in 2021